The France-Portugal football rivalry (also known as The Battle of the Vineyards or Vineyard Wars) is a national level football rivalry. Although the teams first met on the 18th of April of 1926 in a friendly match in France where Portugal lost 4-2, the rivalry only began in 2000 when in the 2000 Euro Portugal lost 2-1 to France after extra time in the Semi-Final round. The first time Portugal played against France in a non-friendly match was on the 23rd of June of 1984 in the 1984 Euro Semi-Final round were Portugal lost 3-2 after extra time in France. The most recent encounter between both teams happpened on the 23rd of June of 2021 in a match of the Euro 2020 group stage that ended 2-2.

Both belong to the strongest football nations of the world, and have met a total of 28 times resulting in 6 victories for Portugal, 3 draws, and 19 victories for France.

Background
The rivalry began in 2000 when France eliminated Portugal from the 2000 Euro. This ignited the rivalry as the Portuguese players felt lots of frustration with the result. France has mostly dominated its encounters with Portugal even before the rivalry started.

Comparison of France's and Portugal's positions in major international tournaments
 Key
 Denotes which team finished better in that particular competition.
DNQ: Did not qualify.
DNP: Did not participate.
TBD: To be determined.

Major Tournaments

UEFA Euro 1984

UEFA Euro 2000

2006 FIFA World Cup

UEFA Euro 2016

2020–21 UEFA Nations League

UEFA Euro 2020

List of matches
Source:

Statistics

All-time top goalscorers
Bold denote players who have not retired from international football

All-time most appearances
Bold denote players who have not retired from international football

See also
2006 FIFA World Cup
UEFA Euro 2016
France–Portugal relations

Notes

References

International association football rivalries
France national football team rivalries
France
Portugal at UEFA Euro 1984
Portugal at UEFA Euro 2000
Portugal at UEFA Euro 2016
Portugal at UEFA Euro 2020
France at UEFA Euro 1984
France at UEFA Euro 2000
France at UEFA Euro 2016
France at UEFA Euro 2020